Julodinae is a subfamily of beetles in the family Buprestidae, containing the following genera:

 Aaata Semenov-Tian-Shanskij, 1906
 Amblysterna Saunders, 1871
 Julodella Semenov-Tian-Shanskij, 1871
 Julodis Eschscholtz, 1829
 †Microjulodis Haupt, 1950
 Neojulodis Kerremans, 1902
 Sternocera Eschscholtz, 1829

References

Polyphaga subfamilies